Luka Šebetić (born 26 May 1994) is a Croatian handball player who plays for GWD Minden and the Croatian national team.

He competed at the 2016 European Men's Handball Championship.

References

External links

1994 births
Living people
Croatian male handball players
Sportspeople from Bjelovar
RK Zagreb players